The 2022 President's Cup was a professional tennis tournament played on outdoor hard courts. It was the seventeenth edition of the men's tournament which was part of the 2022 ATP Challenger Tour, and the thirteenth edition of the women's tournament which was part of the 2022 ITF Women's World Tennis Tour. It took place in Nur-Sultan, Kazakhstan between 18 and 24 July 2022.

Champions

Men's singles

  Roman Safiullin def.  Denis Yevseyev 2–6, 6–4, 7–6(7–2).

Men's doubles

  Nam Ji-sung /  Song Min-kyu def.  Andrew Paulson /  David Poljak 6–2, 3–6, [10–6].

Women's singles

  Moyuka Uchijima def.  Natalija Stevanović, 6–3, 7–6(7–2)

Women's doubles

  Mariia Tkacheva /  Anastasia Zolotareva def.  Momoko Kobori /  Moyuka Uchijima, 4–6, 6–1, [10–4]

Men's singles main draw entrants

Seeds

 1 Rankings are as of 11 July 2022.

Other entrants
The following players received wildcards into the singles main draw:
  Grigoriy Lomakin
  Dostanbek Tashbulatov
  Beibit Zhukayev

The following player received entry into the singles main draw using a protected ranking:
  Rubin Statham

The following players received entry from the qualifying draw:
  Alafia Ayeni
  Yankı Erel
  Hong Seong-chan
  Ivan Liutarevich
  Nam Ji-sung
  Dominik Palán

Women's singles main draw entrants

Seeds

 1 Rankings are as of 11 July 2022.

Other entrants
The following players received wildcards into the singles main draw:
  Gozal Ainitdinova
  Erkezhan Arystanbekova
  Sandugash Kenzhibayeva
  Aruzhan Sagandikova

The following players received entry from the qualifying draw:
  Tatiana Barkova
  Momoko Kobori
  Daria Kudashova
  Sofya Lansere
  Ekaterina Maklakova
  Kira Pavlova
  Dana Shakirova
  Cody Wong Hong-yi

References

External links
 2022 President's Cup at ATPtour.com
 2022 President's Cup at ITFtennis.com
 Official website

President's Cup (tennis)
2022 ATP Challenger Tour
2022 ITF Women's World Tennis Tour
2022 in Kazakhstani sport
July 2022 sports events in Asia